"Scar" is a pop song written by Australian singer Missy Higgins and Kevin Griffin of American band Better Than Ezra. Released on 2 August 2004 on Eleven: A Music Company, it was released as the first single from Higgins' debut album, The Sound of White (2004). The single is her most successful thus far, entering the Australian ARIA Singles Chart at number one and going platinum. It also charted in New Zealand, where it peaked at number 20 in January 2005. The song was mixed by 12-time Grammy winner Jay Newland.

Background
The song has been rumored to give a hint to Higgins's bisexuality, although she has not openly commented on the song's meaning.

Awards and nominations

Awards
 2004 ARIA Awards, Best Pop Release
 2005 APRA Awards, Song of the Year
 2005 APRA Awards, Breakthrough Award

Nominations
 2004 ARIA Awards, Single of the Year
 2004 ARIA Awards, Best Female Artist
 2004 ARIA Awards, Breakthrough Artist — Single
 2004 ARIA Awards, Best Video

Track listing
Australian CD single
 "Scar" – 3:34
 "Casualty" – 4:12
 "Dancing Dirt into the Snow" – 3:26
 "The Cactus That Found the Beat" – 2:02

Personnel
Personnel are lifted from the Australian CD single liner notes.

 Missy Higgins – lyrics, music, vocals
 Kevin Griffin – music
 John Porter – production
 Rik Pekkonen – engineering
 Jay Newland – mixing
 Don Bartley – mastering
 Cathie Glassby – artwork design
 Adrienne Overall – photography

Charts

Weekly charts

Year-end charts

Certifications

Release history

References

2004 singles
2004 songs
APRA Award winners
ARIA Award-winning songs
Bisexuality-related songs
Eleven: A Music Company singles
Missy Higgins songs
Number-one singles in Australia
Reprise Records singles
Songs written by Kevin Griffin
Songs written by Missy Higgins